Bo (Spanish: Boo ) is one of 18 parish (administrative division)  in Aller, a municipality within the province and autonomous community of Asturias, in northern Spain. 

Villages and hamlets
 Bo
 Bustiyé
 El Caliyu
 La Cotá
 Carrerayana
 Pando
 La Pena
 La Pruvía
 Rotella
 La Terrona
 Viaonga
 Love

References

Parishes in Aller